Rod Skoe (born August 9, 1954) is a Minnesota politician and former member of the Minnesota Senate. A member of the Minnesota Democratic–Farmer–Labor Party (DFL), he represented District 2, which included all or portions of Becker, Beltrami, Clearwater, Hubbard, Lake of the Woods, Mahnomen, Otter Tail and Wadena counties in the northwestern part of the state.

Education
Skoe completed high school at Kelliher High School in Kelliher, and later received a B.A. from Augsburg College in Minneapolis.

Minnesota House of Representatives
Skoe served in the Minnesota House of Representatives representing District 2B from 1999 to 2003.

Minnesota Senate
Skoe was first elected in 2002 and was re-elected in every subsequent election since then until 2016. He chaired the senate tax committee from 2012 to 2016.   In 2016 he lost to Republican Paul Utke.

Electoral history

Personal life
He and his wife, Sarah, have two children.

References

External links

Minnesota Public Radio Votetracker: Senator Rod Skoe
Project Vote Smart - Senator Rod Skoe Profile
Follow the Money - Rod Skoe Campaign Contributions
2008 2006 2004 2002 2000 1998

1954 births
Living people
Democratic Party Minnesota state senators
Democratic Party members of the Minnesota House of Representatives
People from Clearwater County, Minnesota
American Lutherans
21st-century American politicians